Gesneriaceae, the gesneriad family, is a family of flowering plants consisting of about 152 genera and ca. 3,540 species in the tropics and subtropics of the Old World (almost all Didymocarpoideae) and the New World (most Gesnerioideae), with a very small number extending to temperate areas. Many species have colorful and showy flowers and are cultivated as ornamental plants.

Etymology
The family name is based on the genus Gesneria, which honours Swiss naturalist and humanist Conrad Gessner.

Description

Most species are herbaceous perennials or subshrubs but a few are woody shrubs or small trees. The phyllotaxy is usually opposite and decussate, but leaves have a spiral or alternate arrangement in some groups.  As with other members of the Lamiales the flowers have a (usually) zygomorphic corolla whose petals are fused into a tube and there is no one character that separates a gesneriad from any other member of Lamiales. Gesneriads differ from related families of the Lamiales in having an unusual inflorescence structure, the "pair-flowered cyme", but some gesneriads lack this characteristic, and some other Lamiales (Calceolariaceae and some Scrophulariaceae) share it.  The ovary can be superior, half-inferior or fully inferior, and the fruit a dry or fleshy capsule or a berry. The seeds are always small and numerous. Gesneriaceae have traditionally been separated from Scrophulariaceae by having a unilocular rather than bilocular ovary, with parietal rather than axile placentation.

Taxonomy
"Gesneriaceae" is a conserved name (nom. cons.), meaning that although alternative, less well used names for the family were published earlier, the International Code of Nomenclature for algae, fungi, and plants specifies this as the name to be used. It was published by Louis Claude Richard and Antoine Laurent de Jussieu in 1816. In 1829, Barthélemy Dumortier divided the family into two tribes, based on the number of stamens. However, the only genus he placed in his two-stamen tribe, Columellia, is now placed in the separate family Columelliaceae. Dumortier's publication has been treated as the first for the family by some sources.

Botanists who have made significant contributions to the systematics of the family are George Bentham, Robert Brown, B.L. Burtt, C.B. Clarke, Olive Mary Hilliard, Joseph Dalton Hooker, William Jackson Hooker, Karl Fritsch, Elmer Drew Merrill, Harold E. Moore, Jr., John L. Clark, Conrad Vernon Morton, Henry Nicholas Ridley, Laurence Skog, W.T. Wang, Anton Weber, and Hans Wiehler. The Gesneriad Society is an international horticultural society devoted to the promotion, cultivation, and study of Gesneriaceae.

Phylogeny
From about 1997 onwards, molecular phylogenetic studies led to extensive changes in the classification of  the family Gesneriaceae and its genera, many of which have been re-circumscribed or synonymized. New species are still being discovered, particularly in Asia, and may further change generic boundaries. A consensus phylogeny used to build classifications of the family in 2013 and 2020 is shown below (to the level of tribes). The family Calceolariaceae is shown as the sister to Gesneriaceae.

A phylogenomic study published in 2021 which used 418 nuclear genes confirmed the monophyly of all the subfamilies and tribes. It resolved Peltanthera as sister to a clade of Calceolariaceae and Gesneriaceae. Within the Gesnerioideae, Napeantheae rather than Titanotricheae was found to be sister to the remaining tribes. The position of Titanotricheae varied according to the method used to build the cladogram, which the authors suggested was due to incomplete lineage sorting following rapid divergence. The phylogenetic position of Titanotrichum remains unsettled.

The genus Sanango has not always been included in Gesneriaceae. However, molecular phylogenetic studies published up to and including 2021 suggest that it does belong in the family as the most basal member, and it is placed in its own subfamily. The studies also show the genus Peltanthera to be outside the family, although some sources still place it within the Gesneriaceae. The genus Rehmannia has also sometimes been included in the family but is now referred to the family Orobanchaceae. 

No single morphological feature absolutely divides two main subfamilies (i.e. forms a uniform synapomorphy). Gesnerioideae seedlings have normal cotyledons of the same size and shape (isocotylous). The cotyledons of Didymocarpoideae are usually, but not always, eventually different in size and shape (anisocotylous). One cotyledon ceases to grow and withers away, while the other continues to grow, and may even form a very large leaf that is the only one the plant has (Monophyllaea, some Streptocarpus). Gesnerioideae flowers usually have four fertile stamens, rarely two or five. Didymocarpoideae flowers usually have two fertile stamens, less often four, rarely one or five.

Subfamilies and genera

On the basis of molecular phylogenetic, morphological and biogeographical differences, the family has been divided into two major subfamilies: subfamily Didymocarpoideae (formerly Cyrtandroideae) with all but one species from the Old World, and subfamily Gesnerioideae native from the Americas west through the Pacific to Australia and southeastern China. The genus Sanango is placed in its own subfamily, Sanangoideae. The two main subfamilies are further divided into tribes and subtribes.

Genera accepted by Plants of the World Online (PoWO)  are listed below, together with their placement in a subfamily and tribe by Weber et al. (2020). Three genera are listed by PoWO but not by Weber et al.: Coptocheile Hoffmanns. (doubtfully placed in Gesneriaceae), Parakohleria Wiehler (now included in Pearcea) and Peltanthera Benth. (excluded from Gesneriaceae by molecular phylogenetic studies).

Ecology
About half of the New World species (i.e. the subfamily Gesnerioideae) are co-adapted to bird pollination, particularly by hummingbirds in the Americas. Bird-pollinated species typically have two-lipped flowers in shades of red; examples are found in the genera Asteranthera, Columnea and Sinningia. Among Old World genera, Aeschynanthus has similar flowers.

Cultivation
Some genera in the family are grown as ornamental plants, both as garden plants and as houseplants. Such genera include: Aeschynanthus, Achimenes, Columnea, Gesneria, Haberlea, Nematanthus (syn. Hypocyrta), Ramonda, and Streptocarpus (Cape primroses, African violets). One of the most familiar members of the family to gardeners are the African violets in Streptocarpus section Saintpaulia.  Gesneriads are divided culturally into three groups on the basis of whether, and how, their stems are modified into storage organs: rhizomatous, tuberous, and "fibrous-rooted", meaning those that lack such storage structures (although all gesneriads have fibrous roots).

References

External links

World Checklist of Gesneriaceae
Genera of Gesneriaceae
Gesneriad Reference Web
Gesneriaceae:  A Scientific Overview, by Prof. Anton Weber (on the Gesneriad Reference Web)
Gesneriaceae in Flora of China
The Gesneriad Society (formerly the American Gloxinia and Gesneriad Society)
Annotated Bibliography of the Gesneriaceae
Phylogenetic relationships in the Gesnerioideae (Gesneriaceae) based on nrDNA ITS and cpDNA trnL-F and trnE-T spacer region sequences  (link to abstract)
Evolution of Cyrtandra (Gesneriaceae) in the Pacific Ocean: the origin of a supertramp clade
Weber, A. 2004. Gesneriaceae and Scrophulariaceae: Robert Brown and now. Telopea 10(2): 543-571.
Gesneriaceae: All you need to know about gesneriads.

 
Lamiales families